Formula Woman, which was  known as the Privilege Insurance Formula Woman Championship for sponsorship reasons, is a female-only one make racing series started in 2004 in the UK.  It was inspired by the lack of female drivers in other series and was created, amongst other reasons, to boost the female audience of the sport.

In November 2020 it was announced that Formula Woman would be making a come-back in 2021.

Original series
In 2004, all 16 drivers raced Mazda RX-8s over seven rounds around four British racing circuits. For 2005, support was dropped by Mazda and instead drivers competed in Caterham 7s.

2004
The inaugural season of Formula Woman was based around a television series in ITV.  Thousands of women applied to join, with ultimately 17 drivers being chosen to compete.  Experienced motoring journalist Vicki Butler-Henderson hosted the ITV show, while racing drivers Katherine Legge and Tim Harvey were both part of the judging panel. Legge left for unknown reasons early into the selection process.

Race calendar

Championship standings
The 2004 championship was won by Natasha Firman.

2005
Formula Woman returned in 2005 using Caterham 7s after Mazda withdrew support.  The series was run as a Nations Cup.  Natalie Butler from England won the 2005 Championship.

Entry list

Following the end of the season in November, a novices race weekend was held at Pembrey, South Wales, using exclusive Caterham 7 race cars, with a record 62 women competing. The four race winners were automatically given entry to the 2006 Formula Woman championship.

Novice Race winners

2006
The series continued in 2006, again using the Caterham 7 car but without any television coverage.  Ultimately, Nikki Welsby won the championship.

The series was not renewed for 2007.

New Formula Woman series
In November 2020, it was announced that Formula Woman would be making a come-back. The series opened for applicants in March 2021 with a view to the series starting in the autumn of the same year with an accompanying television package. The new competition prize will offer winners the opportunity to race a McLaren 570S GT4 in the British GT Cup Championship that 16 drivers will compete for.

The series secured major sponsorship including McLaren, Trade Centre, Vauxhall, and many more.

Test days have taken place at circuits including Knockhill and Anglesey Circuit.  As of December 2021, the assessments for the final driver decisions were on-going following a test day at Bedford Autodrome using Vauxhall Corsa-e cars.

In March 2022, the competition progressed to select 15 finalists from 70, with more selections involving a track kart test at Croft to achieve 10, followed by a future final race for four contestants.

See also
W Series, an all-female racing series founded in 2018

References

Further reading

External links

Sports car racing series
One-make series